François Noudelmann is a contemporary French philosopher, university professor and radio producer.

François Noudelmann is currently a professor at New York University, and regularly at the University of Paris VIII (Université de Vincennes à Saint-Denis), and European Graduate School in Saas-Fee (Switzerland). He is a member of the Institut Universitaire de France. Between 2001 and 2004, he was the director of the Collège International de Philosophie (Ciph) in Paris. Since 2019, he runs La Maison française at NYU.

Between 2002 and 2013, Noudelmann produced and hosted weekly and daily radio shows on France-Culture, notably Les Vendredis de la philosophie and Macadam philo. From 2008 to 2009 Noudelmann coordinated and participated in the blog project 24 heures philo (24 hours Philosophy) for the French newspaper Libération, combining news, critical theory and philosophy.

In 2009 and 2010 Noudelmann produced and hosted Je l'entends comme je l'aime, a Sunday evening radio show on France Culture which draws on the many relationships between music and the arts, philosophy, literature, poetry, science, and more. Previous guests have included Hélène Cixous, Jean-Luc Nancy, Alain Badiou, Slavoj Zizek among many others. He hosted a daily program called Le Journal de la philosophie between 2010 and 2013.

Noudelmann's first novel Les Enfants de Cadillac was published in 2021. The book was shortlisted for the Prix Femina, the Prix André Malraux, and the Prix Goncourt. Since Noudelmann's partner, Camille Laurens, is a member of the Goncourt committee, the book was set aside from the competition. The académie Goncourt has since changed its rules, excluding competitors with ties to its members.

Books
Les Enfants de Cadillac, Gallimard, 2021 
Un tout autre Sartre, Gallimard, 2020 
Penser avec les oreilles, Max Milo, 2019 
Édouard Glissant. L'Identité généreuse, Flammarion, 2018 
L'Entretien du Monde (with Édouard Glissant), PUV, 2018 
Le Génie du mensonge, Max Milo, 2015, paperback Pocket 2017 
Les Airs de famille. Une philosophie des affinités, Gallimard, 2012 
Le Toucher des philosophes. Sartre, Nietzsche et Barthes au piano, Gallimard, 2008 (grand prix des Muses 2009).  The Philosopher's Touch, Columbia University Press, 2012, 
Hors de moi, Léo Scheer, 2006. 
Samuel Beckett, with B. Clément, Adpf publications, 2006. 
Jean-Paul Sartre, Adpf publications, 2005. 
Pour en finir avec la généalogie, Léo Scheer, 2004. 
Avant-gardes et modernité, Hachette, 2000. 
Beckett ou La scène du pire, Honoré Champion, 1998. 
Image et absence: Essai sur le regard, L'Harmattan, 1998. 
Sartre: L'incarnation imaginaire, L'Harmattan, 1996. 
La Culture et l'homme, avec G. Barrère et MP Lachaud, Dunod, 1994. 
Huis clos et Les mouches de Jean-Paul Sartre, Gallimard, 1993, rééd. 2006.

In conversation with 
 Penser l'avenir, with André Gorz, La Découverte, 2019. 
 L'Entretien du monde, with Édouard Glissant, PUV, 2018.

Other publications
Archipels Glissant, with F. Simasotchi-Bronès and Y. Toma, PUV, 2020. 
Soundings and Soundscapes, with S. Kay, Paragraph, Edinburgh University Press, 2018. 
Édouard Glissant, la pensée du détour, with F. Simasotchi-Bronès, Armand Colin/Dunod, 2014.
Filiation and its discontents, with R. Harvey and E-A Kaplan, SUNY-SB papers, 2009.
Dictionnaire Sartre, with G. Philippe, Honoré Champion, 2004.
Politique et filiation, with R. Harvey and E-A Kaplan, Kimé, 2004.
Les 20 ans du Collège international de philosophie with A. Soulez, Rue Descartes, P.U.F., 2004.
Politiques de la communauté, with G. Bras, P.U.F., 2003.
Le matériau, voir et entendre, with A. Soulez, P.U.F., 2002.
L’étranger dans la mondialité, P.U.F., 2002.
Roland Barthes après Roland Barthes, with F. Gaillard, P.U.F., 2002.
Scène et image, with D. Moncond'huy, La Licorne, 2000.
Ponge : matière, matériau, matérialisme, with N. Barberger and H. Scepi, La Licorne, 2000.
Suite, série, séquence, with D. Moncond'huy, 1998.
Le corps a découvert, S.T.H., 1992.
La nature, de l'identité à la liberté, S.T.H., 1991.

References

External links
 François Noudelmann @ European Graduate School. Faculty Page with Biography, Bibliography and Video Lectures.

Living people
Academic staff of Paris 8 University Vincennes-Saint-Denis
Academic staff of European Graduate School
French philosophers
French male non-fiction writers
Year of birth missing (living people)
New York University faculty